Dreitorspitze is a large and very prominent, multi-peak mountain massif in the eastern part of the Wetterstein Mountains in southern Germany. The main peak of the fourth highest mountain massif in Germany is the Leutasch Dreitorspitze, which is also known as the Karlspitze. The Dreitorspitze marks the spot where the main chain of the Wetterstein mountains changes direction from its primary east-west orientation to run northwards for a short distance, before turning back again onto its main axis. East of the Dreitorspitze lies the karst plateau of the Leutasch Platt, comparable to the Zugspitzplatt at the foot of the Zugspitze.

The easiest route to the main peaks may be climbed at grades 1 and 2. An easy Klettersteig runs up to the western summit of the Partenkirchen Dreitorspitze, secured with cables, which is named after the famous explorer of the Northern Limestone Alps, Hermann von Barth. All the other peaks are reserved for climbers. Climbing the peaks is usually part of a two-day tour with an overnight stop at the Meilerhütte hut. A one-day tour requires climbers to be in very good condition.

Valley settlements: Partenkirchen (Germany), Leutasch (Austria), Mittenwald (Germany)
Bases: Meilerhütte (Garmisch-Partenkirchen Section of the German Alpine Club)

References

Mountains of the Alps
Mountains of Bavaria
Mountains of Tyrol (state)
Wetterstein
Garmisch-Partenkirchen (district)
Two-thousanders of Germany
Two-thousanders of Austria